Sioux Falls is the most populous city in the U.S. state of South Dakota and the 130th-most populous city in the United States. It is the county seat of Minnehaha County and also extends into Lincoln County to the south, which continues up to the Iowa state line. As of 2020, Sioux Falls had a population of 192,517. The Sioux Falls metro area accounts for more than 30% of the state's population. Chartered in 1856 on the banks of the Big Sioux River, the city is situated in the rolling hills at the junction of interstates 29 and 90.

History

The history of Sioux Falls revolves around the cascades of the Big Sioux River. The falls were created about 14,000 years ago during the last ice age. The lure of the falls has been a powerful influence. Ho-Chunk, Ioway, Otoe, Missouri, Omaha (and Ponca at the time), Quapaw, Kansa, Osage, Arikira, Dakota, and Cheyenne people inhabited and settled the region previous to Europeans and European descendants. Numerous burial mounds still exist on the high bluffs near the river and are spread throughout the general vicinity. Indigenous people maintained an agricultural society with fortified villages, and the later arrivals rebuilt on many of the same sites that were previously settled. Lakota populate urban and reservation communities in the contemporary state and many Lakota, Dakota, and numerous other Indigenous Americans reside in Sioux Falls today.

French voyagers/explorers visited the area in the early 18th century. The first documented visit by an American of European descent was by Philander Prescott, who camped overnight at the falls in December 1832. Captain James Allen led a military expedition out of Fort Des Moines in 1844. Jacob Ferris described the Falls in his 1856 book "The States and Territories of the Great West".

Two separate groups, the Dakota Land Company of St. Paul and the Western Town Company of Dubuque, Iowa organized in 1856 to claim the land around the falls, considered a promising townsite for its beauty and water power. Each laid out  claims, but worked together for mutual protection. They built a temporary barricade of turf which they dubbed "Fort Sod", in response to native tribes attempting to defend their land from the settlers. Seventeen men then spent "the first winter" in Sioux Falls. The following year the population grew to near 40.

Although conflicts in Minnehaha County between Native Americans and white settlers were few, the Dakota War of 1862 engulfed nearby southwestern Minnesota. The town was evacuated in August of that year when two local settlers were killed as a result of the conflict. The settlers and soldiers stationed here traveled to Yankton in late August 1862. The abandoned townsite was pillaged and burned.

Fort Dakota, a military reservation established in present-day downtown, was established in May 1865. Many former settlers gradually returned and a new wave of settlers arrived in the following years. The population grew to 593 by 1873, and a building boom was underway in that year.

The arrival of the railroads ushered in the great Dakota Boom decade of the 1880s. The population of Sioux Falls mushroomed from 2,164 in 1880 to 10,167 at the close of the decade. The growth transformed the city. A severe plague of grasshoppers and a national depression halted the boom by the early 1890s. The city grew by only 89 people from 1890 to 1900.

But prosperity eventually returned with the opening of the John Morrell meat packing plant in 1909, the establishment of an airbase and a military radio and communications training school in 1942, and the completion of the interstate highways in the early 1960s. Much of the growth in the first part of the 20th century was fueled by agriculturally based industry, such as the Morrell plant and the nearby stockyards (one of the largest in the nation).

In 1955 the city decided to consolidate the neighboring incorporated city of South Sioux Falls. At the time South Sioux Falls had a population of nearly 1,600 inhabitants, according to the 1950 census. It was the third largest city in the county after Sioux Falls and Dell Rapids. By October 18, 1955, South Sioux Falls residents voted 704 in favor and 227 against to consolidate with Sioux Falls. On the same issue, Sioux Falls residents voted on November 15 by the vote 2,714 in favor and 450 against.

In 1981, to take advantage of recently relaxed state usury laws, Citibank relocated its primary credit card center from New York City to Sioux Falls. Some claim that this event was the primary impetus for the increased population and job growth rates that Sioux Falls has experienced over the past quarter-century. Others point out that Citibank's relocation was only part of a more general transformation of the city's economy from an industrially based one to an economy centered on health care, finance, and retail trade.

Sioux Falls has grown at a rapid pace since the late 1970s, with the city's population increasing from 81,182 in 1980 to 192,517 in 2020.

2019 tornadoes
On the night of September 10, 2019, the south side of Sioux Falls was hit by three strong EF2 tornadoes, severely damaging at least 37 buildings, including the Plaza 41 Shopping Center. One tornado hit the Avera Heart Hospital, damaging portions of the roof and windows, and causing seven injuries, including a man who fractured his skull as he was thrown into an exterior wall of the hospital. Another tornado hit the busy commercial district near the Empire Mall, injuring one woman inside her home. Another touched down on the far south side in a suburban residential area, tearing the roofs off homes. The total damage was more than $5 million.

Geography
Sioux Falls has been assigned the ZIP Codes 57101, 57103–57110, 57117–57118, 57188–57189, and 57192–57198, and the FIPS place code 59020.

Metropolitan area
The Sioux Falls Metropolitan Statistical Area consists of four South Dakota counties: Lincoln, McCook, Minnehaha, and Turner. The estimated population of this MSA in 2017 was 259,094, an increase of 13.51% from the 2010 census. According to recent estimates, Lincoln County is the 16th-fastest-growing county in the United States. In addition to Sioux Falls, the metropolitan area includes Canton, Brandon, Dell Rapids, Tea, Harrisburg, Worthing, Beresford, Lennox, Hartford, Crooks, Baltic, Montrose, Salem, Renner, Rowena, Chancellor, Colton, Humboldt, Parker, Hurley, Garretson, Sherman, Corson, Viborg, Irene, and Centerville.

Climate
Due to its inland location and relatively high latitude, Sioux Falls has a humid continental climate (Köppen Dfa) characterized by hot, humid summers and cold, dry winters. It is in USDA Plant Hardiness Zone 4b. Snowfall occurs mostly in light to moderate amounts during the winter, totaling . Precipitation, at  annually, is concentrated in the warmer months. This results in frequent thunderstorms in summer from convection being built up with the unstable weather patterns.

Demographics

2010 census
As of the census of 2010, there were 153,888 people, 61,707 households, and 37,462 families residing in the city. The racial makeup of the city was 86.8% White, 4.2% African American, 2.7% Native American, 1.8% Asian, 0.1% Pacific Islander, 2.0% from other races, and 2.5% from two or more races. Hispanic or Latino of any race were 4.4% of the population.

There were 61,707 households, of which 31.9% had children under the age of 18 living with them, 45.5% were married couples living together, 10.9% had a female householder with no husband present, 4.4% had a male householder with no wife present, and 39.3% were non-families. 30.6% of all households were made up of individuals, and 8.7% had someone living alone who was 65 years of age or older. The average household size was 2.40 and the average family size was 3.02.

The median age in the city was 33.6 years. 24.6% of residents were under the age of 18; 10.7% were between the ages of 18 and 24; 29.7% were from 25 to 44; 24.1% were from 45 to 64; and 10.9% were 65 years of age or older. The gender makeup of the city was 49.6% male and 50.4% female.

In 2015, the median household income in Minnehaha County, SD was $59,884, while Lincoln County, SD was $76,094. This represents a 0.29% growth from the previous year. The median family income for Sioux Falls was $74,632 in 2015. Males had a median income of $40,187 versus $31,517 for females. The per capita income for the county was $26,392. 11.8% of the population and 8.5% of families were below the poverty line. Out of the total population, 16.8% of those under the age of 18 and 8.8% of those 65 and older were living below the poverty line.

Many European immigrants, primarily from Scandinavia, Germany and the British Isles, settled in South Dakota in the 19th century. By 1890, one-third of the residents of South Dakota were immigrants.

Religion
Most Sioux Falls residents are Lutheran; Catholics are the second-largest group. The Evangelical Lutheran Church in America is the largest Lutheran denomination in the city, with 20 churches in Sioux Falls.

Economy

Partially due to the lack of a state corporate income tax, Sioux Falls is home to a number of financial companies. The largest employers among these are Wells Fargo and Citigroup.

While no longer as economically dominant as it once was, the manufacturing and food processing sector remains an important component of Sioux Falls's economy. The Smithfield Foods/John Morrell meatpacking plant is the city's third-largest employer.

Arts and culture

Events
Downtown Sioux Falls hosts a SculptureWalk every summer and "First Fridays" on the first Friday of each summer month. The Downtown Riverfest is an annual Sioux Falls festival.

Festival of Bands is a regional competition that hosts over 40 marching bands each year from across the Midwest. The Sioux Empire Spectacular is a Drum Corps regional competition. Party in the Park is an annual outdoor musical event held at Terrace Park. The Sioux Empire Fair is a regional fair held at the W. H. Lyon Fairgrounds, and the Sioux Falls JazzFest is hosted at Yankton Trail Park each year.

SiouxperCon is an annual nonprofit fan convention that celebrates comic books, sci-fi, fantasy, anime, board games, and video gaming.

Arts

In the beginning of the 21st century, Sioux Falls experienced a renaissance of cultural interest. The Sioux Empire Arts Council continues to lead in the Sioux Falls area arts scene and gives out Mayor's Awards each year in several categories for excellence demonstrated by Sioux Falls residents. The Sioux Falls SculptureWalk was the first visual evidence of the renaissance and is an attraction for both visitors and resident artists, hosting over 55 sculptures. One of the earliest promoters of the contemporary arts scene was Sheila Agee, who lives in nearby Brandon. Her work was essential to the renovation of the original Washington High School into the Washington Pavilion (housing two performing arts, a visual arts, and a science center).

The Northern Plains Indian Art Market (NPIAM) was established in 1988 by American Indian Services, Inc., of Sioux Falls as the Northern Plains Tribal Arts Show (NPTA). Northern Plains Tribal Arts dominated the Sioux Falls art scene from its inception in 1988. American Indian Services produced the juried art show and market from 1988 to 2003. Since 2004, Sinte Gleca University of Rosebud has been the producing organization. 2012 marked the show's 25th year. Directors have included Marilyn Lone Hill and Jack Herman. In the first 25 years of its existence—one of the longest-running Indian art shows in the country—over 800 artists from 7 northern plains states and two Canadian provinces exhibited at NPTA/NPIAM. Writers for national publications, filmmakers, and researchers have all joined the audiences over the years. Northern Plains Indian Art Market continues under the auspices of Sinte Gleca.

A permanent Northern Plains Tribal Arts collection is housed in the Egger Gallery at the Washington Pavilion. Since the Washington Pavilion opened its doors to the public in 1999, the collection has called the Visual Arts Center home. Originally the pieces were on an extended loan from American Indian Services, Inc.; in 2013, thanks to many supporters, the works were acquired under the title of the Augustana Tribal Arts Collection, and now officially belong to the Visual Arts Center.

As the 21st century began, poetry and literary events became more popular with the opening of the Sioux Empire Arts Council Horse Barn Gallery (then directed by Deb Klebanoff), and due to a National Endowment for the Arts-supported Y Writer's Voice, founded and directed by Allison Hedge Coke. The Y Writer's Voice included an annual reading series of 38 nationally known poets and writers, who performed works and youth workshops through the Sioux Falls Writers Voice in local performance spaces, at the YMCA after-school program, and in local schools, gaining national attention.

The Sioux Falls mayor's awards in literary arts designated movers and shakers during the growth and development of the literary arts scene. Klebanoff, born in Sioux Falls, began the reading series at the Horse Barn with Coke after serving on the Sioux Falls Chamber of Commerce's Cultural Affairs committee, including a term as its chair and for almost a decade with the Sioux Empire Arts Council, including eight years as its executive director. She later moved south of Sioux Falls and founded a writers' retreat, The Retreat at Pointer's Ridge.

In addition to literary awards, there are mayor's awards in visual arts, performing arts, music, organizing in the arts, advocacy, and lifetime achievement, per the mayor's discretion. Many visual artists got their start in and/or represent the city, including Carl Grupp, Mary Groth, Ceca Cooper, Marian Henjum, Brad Kringen, Nancyjane Huehl, Don Hooper, Nathan Holman, Gary Hartenhoff, Sheila Agee, Mary Selvig, Martha Baker, Chad Mohr, Paul Schiller, Liz Heeren, Edward Two Eagle, Edwin Two Eagle, James Starkey, and painter/muralist Byob Mergia.

The Sioux Falls Jazz and Blues Festival is a three-day outdoor musical event featuring two stages and is free to the public. It is held the third weekend in July at Yankton Trail Park. The Sioux Falls Jazz & Blues Society hosts national musicians during its annual concert series. Each year the series includes approximately five concerts with acts from all over the world. JazzFest, with over 125,000 in annual attendance, has expanded over the years to include the Jazziest Diversity Project, the All-City Jazz Ensemble, the Concert Series, and JazzFest Jazz Camp. 2016 was the festival's 25th anniversary year.

In 2019, Levitt at the Falls launched its first season of free concerts in a state-of-the-art outdoor amphitheater in Falls Park West. The Levitt at the Falls project is a three-way partnership between the local Friends of the Levitt Shell Sioux Falls (Levitt at the Falls) nonprofit, the National Mortimer & Mimi Levitt Foundation, and the City of Sioux Falls. All three played key roles in securing the nation's eighth permanent Levitt venue. Levitt at the Falls provides a season of 50 free professional concerts each summer.

The Downtown Riverfest brings live music, art, kids' activities and more in an annual festival that embraces the beauty of the Big Sioux.

Downtown Sioux Falls boasts Ipso Gallery, directed by Liz Bashore Heeren, The Orpheum Theater, SculptureWalk, The Premiere Playhouse, The Good Night Theatre Collective, Sioux Falls State Theater, The Museum of Visual Materials, The Interactive Water Fountain, Falls Park, Creative Spirits, Eastbank Art Gallery, Levitt at the Falls, and the Washington Pavilion, home to the South Dakota Symphony Orchestra and the occasional Poets & Painters show (P1, P2, P3, P4, P5...). Prairie Star Gallery, recently closed, was an additional American Indian Arts gallery and store.

Landmarks

The Washington Pavilion contains the Kirby Science Discovery Center, as well as two performing arts centers that host several Broadway productions and operas. The South Dakota Symphony's home hosts dance groups as well as smaller theater and choral events. The Visual Arts Center, also part of the Pavilion complex, hosts six galleries of changing exhibits, all free of charge. The Wells Fargo Cinedome is a multiformat  dome theater that plays several films each month.

The Great Plains Zoo & Delbridge Museum provides the area with natural history and animal exhibits in its  park, and has dioramas depicting wildlife.

The USS South Dakota Battleship Memorial to the World War II battleship USS South Dakota is on State Highway 42 (West 12th Street) and Kiwanis Avenue.

The 114th Fighter Wing is at Joe Foss Field and houses F-16C/D fighter aircraft. The SD ANG unit is known for its support of community activities and services.

A replica of Michelangelo's David is near the downtown area at Fawick Park.

Sports

The Sioux Falls Canaries were known as the Sioux Falls Fighting Pheasants from 2010 to 2013.

Special sporting events
Sioux Falls has several multipurpose athletic stadiums: the primarily baseball Sioux Falls Stadium, indoor Sioux Falls Arena, indoor Sanford Pentagon, and indoor Denny Sanford Premier Center. Sioux Falls Stadium hosted the 2007 American Association of Independent Professional Baseball all-star game. 

Constructed in 2014, the Denny Sanford Premier Center is home to the Summit League's men's and women's basketball tournaments. The Premier Center also hosted the 2017 USHL/NHL Top Prospects Game.

Government

The city of Sioux Falls is led by a mayor–council (strong mayor) form of government. Mayoral elections occur every four years. City council seats are also contested every four years. Not all councilmembers are elected in the same year, as the elections are staggered throughout even-numbered years. The council consists of five members elected to represent specific sections of the city and three additional seats that represent the city as a whole (that is, at-large). The councilmember position is designed to be part-time. Sioux Falls operates under a home rule charter as permitted by the South Dakota constitution.

In the 2004 presidential election, George W. Bush won both Minnehaha and Lincoln counties, receiving 56% and 65% of the vote, respectively. In 2008, Barack Obama won Minnehaha County by 0.7%, while John McCain won Lincoln County by 15%. Both counties have voted for the Republican nominee in every presidential election since 2012.

Education

Higher education
Sioux Falls is home to Augustana University, the University of Sioux Falls, Sioux Falls Seminary, Southeast Technical College, National American University, the South Dakota School for the Deaf, the University of South Dakota's Sanford School of Medicine (Sioux Falls campus), Stewart School and the South Dakota Public Universities and Research Center (formerly known as USDSU).

Public schools
The Sioux Falls School District serves over 23,000 students living in Sioux Falls and some of its surrounding suburbs. There are 25 elementary schools, seven middle schools, and six high schools, including:

Axtell Park Building
Career and Technical Education Academy
Lincoln High School
Roosevelt High School
Jefferson High School
Washington High School

Private schools
Bishop O'Gorman Catholic Schools is a centralized Catholic school system that includes eight schools: six elementary schools, all PreK-6 (St. Mary, St. Lambert, St. Michael-St. Katharine Drexel, Holy Spirit and Christ the King); one junior high (O'Gorman Junior High, grades 7–8); and one high school, O'Gorman (9–12). The junior and senior high O'Gorman schools are on the same campus. Approximately 2,800 students attend Bishop O'Gorman Catholic Schools. As of the 2009–10 school year the Sioux Falls Catholic School system's St. Joseph Cathedral School was closed.

The Lutheran Church-Missouri Synod operates two schools in Sioux Falls. Sioux Falls Lutheran School is on 37th street, while the Lutheran High School of Sioux Falls is on Western Avenue. In 2018, voters approved a plan to move Sioux Falls Lutheran School to a new building near the I-29/I-229 merge on south Boe Lane. Students moved to the new building at the beginning of the Spring 2020 semester.

The Wisconsin Evangelical Lutheran Synod has two schools in Sioux Falls: Bethel Lutheran and Good Shepherd Lutheran.

Other private schools include Sioux Falls Christian Schools, Christian Center, The Baan Dek Montessori, Cornerstone School, and the Open Arms Christian Child Development Center.

Media

Infrastructure

Transportation

Roads
Most Sioux Falls residents travel and commute by car. Interstate 90 passes east to west across the northern edge of the city, while Interstate 29 bisects the western portion of the city from the north and south. Interstate 229 forms a partial loop around Sioux Falls, and connects with I-90 to the northeast and I-29 to the southwest. A grid design system for city streets is the standard for the central (older) area of the city; secondary streets in newer residential areas have largely abandoned this plan.

Due to current and expected regional growth, several large construction projects have been or will be undertaken. New interchanges have recently been added to I-29. An interchange was also completed on I-90 at Marion Road. I-29 has recently been improved from I-90 to 57th Street. This upgrade includes additional lanes and auxiliary lanes. Over the next decade, the city of Sioux Falls and the South Dakota Department of Transportation plan to construct a limited-access highway around the city's outer edges to the south and east, known as South Dakota Highway 100. This highway will start at the northern Tea exit (Exit 73 on I-29, 101st Street), run east on 101st Street, curve northeast east of Western Avenue, then turn north near Sycamore Avenue. It will end at the Timberline Avenue exit (Exit 402 on I-90). Sioux Falls's major roads include W 41st, Minnesota, Main, W 26th (which becomes Louise as it turns south), 12th, 49th, 57th, and Western.

Public/mass transit

Sioux Area Metro, the local public transit organization, operates 16 bus lines within the city, with most routes operating Monday through Saturday. Recently, the city added a new transfer station in Sioux Falls on Louise Avenue between 49th and 57th Streets. The Sioux Area Metro Paratransit serves members of the community who would otherwise not be able to travel by providing door-to-door service.

Several taxi companies also operate within the city.

Jefferson Lines runs long-distance bus routes to Sioux Falls. Non-transfer destinations include Grand Forks, Kansas City, Minneapolis, and Omaha. Until 1965 a branch of the Milwaukee Road train from Chicago, the Arrow, made a stop in Sioux Falls.

Amtrak passenger trains do not pass through South Dakota.

Air
Five domestic airlines (Delta Air Lines, United Airlines, American Airlines, Allegiant Air, and Frontier Airlines) serve Sioux Falls Regional Airport.

Notable people

 James Abourezk, first Arab-American U.S. senator, now practicing law in Sioux Falls
 Erika M. Anderson, aka EMA, musician and digital media artist
 Jacob M. Appel, author, wrote Coulrophobia & Fata Morgana while living in Sioux Falls
 Shayna Baszler, former women's MMA fighter and professional wrestler
 George Botsford, composer and pianist, noted for the "Black and White Rag"
 Chris Browne, comic strip artist and cartoonist, Hägar the Horrible
 Benny Castillo, 11-year minor league baseball player, manager of Duluth–Superior Dukes, Jamestown Jammers, Yuma Scorpions, and Sioux City Explorers, former Sioux Falls Canaries hitting coach
 Devin Clark,  UFC mixed martial artist
 Dallas Clark, professional football player, Indianapolis Colts (2003–11), Tampa Bay Buccaneers (2012–13), Baltimore Ravens (2013–14)
 Donn Clendenon, MLB first baseman, 1969 World Series MVP
 Dusty Coleman, MLB infielder
 George Jonathan Danforth, South Dakota politician
 Chris Darrow, American multi-instrumentalist and singer-songwriter, Nitty Gritty Dirt Band, Kaleidoscope (American band) 
 Karl Dean, former mayor of Nashville, Tennessee
 Nick Dinsmore, WWE Superstar 1999–2009 and WWE Coach 2012–2015
 William Dougherty, South Dakota politician
 Wallace Dow, architect
 Walker Duehr, professional ice hockey player. He is the first South Dakotan to play in the National Hockey League.
 Oscar Randolph Fladmark, World War II and Korean War fighter pilot, recipient of the Distinguished Flying Cross (United States)
 Terry Forster, pitcher for five MLB teams
 Joe Foss, World War II "ace of aces" fighter pilot, first commissioner of the American Football League (which later became the AFC conference of the NFL); 20th governor of South Dakota
 Michael E. Fossum, astronaut
 Neil Graff, quarterback for several NFL teams
George Barnes Grigsby, delegate to Congress from Alaska Territory
John T. Grigsby, Lieutenant Governor of South Dakota
Melvin Grigsby, American Civil War and Spanish–American War veteran who served as Attorney General of South Dakota
Sioux K. Grigsby, Lieutenant Governor of South Dakota
 Donald A. Haggar, lawyer and legislator
 Mary Hart, television personality, Entertainment Tonight
 Allison Hedge Coke, writer and educator
 Stephanie Herseth Sandlin, U.S. representative from 
 Kirk Hinrich, retired NBA player
 Crystal Johnson, state's attorney for Minnehaha County
 January Jones, actress, best known for playing Betty Draper on Mad Men
Herbert Krause, author (1905–1976)
 David Lillehaug, associate justice of the Minnesota Supreme Court and Attorney General of Minnesota
 Mike Martz, former head coach of NFL's St. Louis Rams, born in Sioux Falls
 Gail Matthius, American actress, cast member on Saturday Night Live
 Milton J. Nieuwsma, author, screenwriter, producer
 Pat O'Brien, television personality, Access Hollywood
 David Soul, actor, co-star of Starsky & Hutch
 David Stenshoel, musician (Boiled in Lead)
 Joan Tabor, actress
 John Thune, South Dakota senator
 Shane Van Boening, professional pool player
 Jerry verDorn, actor, Guiding Light and One Life to Live

Sister cities
Sioux Falls's sister cities are:
 Newry, Mourne and Down District Council, Northern Ireland, United Kingdom
 Potsdam, Germany

See also
 Impact of the COVID-19 pandemic on the meat industry in the United States
 List of cities in South Dakota
 Pandora papers

Notes

References

Further reading
 Olson, Gary D. "Norwegian Immigrants in Early Sioux Falls: A Demographic Profile", Norwegian-American Studies, 36 (2011), pp 45–84.
 Olson, Gary D. "A Dakota Boomtown: Sioux Falls, 1877–1880", Great Plains Quarterly (2004) 24#1 pp 17–30
  The author is Professor Emeritus of History at Augustana College.
 Tingley, Ralph and Tingley, Kathleen. Mission in Sioux Falls: The First Baptist Church, 1875–1975 (1975)
 History of Southeastern Dakota: Its Settlement and Growth (1881)

External links

 
 Sioux Falls Area Chamber of Commerce

 
Cities in South Dakota
Cities in Minnehaha County, South Dakota
Cities in Lincoln County, South Dakota
County seats in South Dakota
Sioux Falls, South Dakota metropolitan area
Populated places established in 1856